Lithium platinate, Li2PtO3, is a chemical compound of lithium, platinum and oxygen. It is a semiconductor with a layered honeycomb crystal structure and a band gap of 2.3 eV, and can be prepared by direct calcination of Pt metal and lithium carbonate at ca. 600 °C. Lithium platinate is a potential lithium-ion battery electrode material, though this application is hindered by the high costs of Pt, as compared to the cheaper Li2MnO3 alternative.

References

Lithium compounds
Platinum(IV) compounds
Transition metal oxyanions